Edward James Forsyth (April 30, 1887 – June 22, 1956) was a Major League Baseball third baseman who played in one game on October 2, 1915 for the Baltimore Terrapins of the Federal League. He was the starting third baseman in the second game of a doubleheader that day; it was the last game the Terrapins would ever play, and the last day the Federal League was in existence.

In his only career Major League game, Forsyth had no hits in three at bats with one walk, and made one error in three chances in the field. The Terrapins lost the game 3-2.  There are no records of Forsyth ever having played professional baseball at any other level.

External links

1887 births
1956 deaths
Major League Baseball third basemen
Baltimore Terrapins players
Baseball players from New York (state)
Sportspeople from Kingston, New York